Alfred Krupp (1812–1887) was a German industrialist.

Alfred Krupp may refer to:
Friedrich Alfred Krupp (1854–1902), German industrialist
Alfried Krupp von Bohlen und Halbach (1907–1967), German industrialist

See also
Krupp

Krupp, Alfred